Auguste-Étienne Villemot (1811, Versailles – 19 September 1870, Paris) was a 19th-century French journalist.

References

Works 
La Vie à Paris, chroniques du Figaro, précédées d'une Étude sur l'esprit en France à notre époque par P.-J. Stahl, 2 volumes, Paris, Hetzel, 1858.
(with Paul Siraudin) Le Favori de la favorite, two-act comedy for the theatre of Baden-Baden, 1860.

Sources 
Georges d'Heylli, Dictionnaire des pseudonymes, Paris, Dentu, 1887, (p. 340).
Hippolyte de Villemessant, Mémoires d'un journaliste, deuxième série (Les Hommes de mon temps), Paris, Dentu, 1872, (p. 9–58).
Francisque Sarcey, « Villemot », Le Journal du siège de Paris, publié par Le Gaulois, Paris, 1871, (p. 18–19).
Gustave Vapereau, Dictionnaire universel des contemporains, Paris, Hachette, 1870, (p. 1819).

1811 births
1870 deaths
People from Versailles
19th-century French journalists
French male journalists
Chevaliers of the Légion d'honneur
Burials at Montparnasse Cemetery
19th-century French male writers
Le Figaro people